James Henry Ellis (25 September 1924 – 25 November 1997) was a British engineer and cryptographer. In 1970, while working at the Government Communications Headquarters (GCHQ) in Cheltenham, he conceived of the possibility of "non-secret encryption", more commonly termed public-key cryptography.

Early life, education and career
Ellis was born in Britain, although he was conceived in Australia, and grew up in Britain. He almost died at birth, and it was thought that he might be learning disabled. He became an orphan who lived with his grandparents in London's East End. He showed a gift for mathematics and physics at a grammar school in Leyton, and gained a degree in physics. He then worked at the Post Office Research Station at Dollis Hill. In 1952, Ellis joined the Government Communications Headquarters (GCHQ) in Eastcote, west London. In 1965, he moved to Cheltenham to join the newly formed Communications-Electronics Security Group (CESG), an arm of GCHQ. In 1949, Ellis married Brenda, an artist and designer, and they had four children but she never knew anything about his work.

Invention of non-secret encryption
Ellis first proposed his scheme for "non-secret encryption" in 1970, in a (then) secret GCHQ internal report "The Possibility of Secure Non-Secret Digital Encryption".

Ellis said that the idea first occurred to him after reading a paper from World War II by someone at Bell Labs describing the scheme named Project C43, a way to protect voice communications by the receiver adding (and then later subtracting) random noise (possibly this 1944 paper or the 1945 paper co-authored by Claude Shannon). He realised that 'noise' could be applied mathematically but was unable to devise a way to implement the idea.

Shortly after joining GCHQ in September 1973, after studying mathematics at Cambridge University, Clifford Cocks was told of Ellis' proof and that no one had been able to figure out a way to implement it. He went home, thought about it, and returned with the basic idea for what has become known as the RSA asymmetric key encryption algorithm. Because any new and potentially beneficial/harmful technique developed by GCHQ is by definition classified information, the discovery was kept secret.

Not long thereafter, Cocks' friend and fellow mathematician, Malcolm Williamson, now also working at GCHQ, after being told of Cocks' and Ellis' work, thought about the problem of key distribution and developed what has since become known as Diffie–Hellman key exchange. Again, this discovery was classified information and it was therefore kept secret.

When, a few years later, Diffie and Hellman published their 1976 paper, and shortly after that Rivest, Shamir and Adleman announced their algorithm, Cocks, Ellis and Williamson suggested that GCHQ announce that they had previously developed both. GCHQ decided against publication at the time.

At this point, only GCHQ and the National Security Agency (NSA) in the USA knew about the work of Ellis, Cocks and Williamson.  Whitfield Diffie heard a rumour, probably from the NSA, and travelled to see James Ellis. The two men talked about a range of subjects until, at the end, Diffie asked Ellis "Tell me how you invented public-key cryptography". After a long pause, Ellis replied "Well, I don't know how much I should say.  Let me just say that you people made much more of it than we did."

On 18 December 1997, Clifford Cocks delivered a public talk which contained a brief history of GCHQ's contribution so that Ellis, Cocks and Williamson received some acknowledgment after nearly three decades of secrecy.  James Ellis died on 25 November 1997, a month before the public announcement was made.

In March 2016, the director of GCHQ made a speech at MIT re-emphasising GCHQ's early contribution to public-key cryptography and in particular the contributions of Ellis, Cocks and Williamson.

References

External links

 Ellis, J.H., The possibility of secure non-secret digital encryption, CSEG Report 3006, January 1970.
 Ellis, J.H., The possibility of secure non-secret analogue encryption, CSEG Report 3007, May 1970.

Alumni of Imperial College London
GCHQ cryptographers
History of computing in the United Kingdom
Modern cryptographers
People from Leytonstone
Public-key cryptographers
1924 births
1997 deaths
Engineers from London